Gnathophis xenica is an eel in the family Congridae (conger/garden eels). It was described by Kiyomatsu Matsubara and Akira Ochiai in 1951, originally as a subspecies of Arisoma nystromi. It is a marine, temperate water-dwelling eel which is known from Japan, in the northwestern Pacific Ocean. Males can reach a maximum total length of 32 centimeters.

References

xenica
Fish described in 1951
Taxa named by Kiyomatsu Matsubara